Psyche quadrangularis is a moth of the Psychidae family. It is found in the grasslands and deserts of Southwestern and Central Asia.

The larvae build a typical square-shaped case made of small twigs they cut to size and join at almost perfect right angles.

References

Psychidae
Moths of Asia